Stefana Veljković (born 9 January 1990, in Svetozarevo) is a Serbian volleyball player who competed in the 2008, 2012 and 2016. In 2016, she won the silver medal with the Serbian team. With the Srpskin team she also won the 2018 FIVB Volleyball Women's World Championship.

Awards

Clubs
2015–16 Polish Volleyball League —  Champion, with KPS Chemik Police
2016–17 Polish Volleyball League —  Champion, with KPS Chemik Police
2017–18 Polish Volleyball League —  Champion, with KPS Chemik Police
2018–19 CEV Champions League —  Champion, with AGIL Volley
2018–19 Italian Volleyball Cup —  Champion, with AGIL Volley

Individual
2009–10 CEV Cup Final Four "Best server"
2017 European Championship "Best Middle Blocker"

External links

Serbian Volleyball Association

1990 births
Living people
Sportspeople from Jagodina
Serbian women's volleyball players
Olympic volleyball players of Serbia
Volleyball players at the 2008 Summer Olympics
Volleyball players at the 2012 Summer Olympics
Galatasaray S.K. (women's volleyball) players
European champions for Serbia
Volleyball players at the 2016 Summer Olympics
Olympic silver medalists for Serbia
Olympic medalists in volleyball
Medalists at the 2016 Summer Olympics
Expatriate volleyball players in Italy
Expatriate volleyball players in Poland
Expatriate volleyball players in Turkey
Serbian expatriate sportspeople in Italy
Serbian expatriate sportspeople in Poland
Serbian expatriate sportspeople in Turkey
Universiade medalists in volleyball
Universiade silver medalists for Serbia
Medalists at the 2009 Summer Universiade
Serie A1 (women's volleyball) players